Archery competitions at the 2015 Pan American Games in Toronto was held from July 14 to 18 at Varsity Stadium. Just like in the Olympics, the archery competition was conducted using the recurve bow. A total of four archery events were held: two each for men and women.

The 2015 World Archery Championships were scheduled for later in July, to not conflict with the games.

Venue

The competitions took place at the Varsity Stadium, located on the downtown campus of the University of Toronto. The facility is about five kilometers from the athletes village. The stadium will have a capacity of 2,000 people per session.

Competition schedule
The following is the competition schedule for the archery competitions:

Medal table

Medalists

Participating nations
A total of 15 countries have qualified athletes. The number of athletes a nation has entered is in parentheses beside the name of the country.

Qualification

A total of 64 archers (32 per gender) qualified to compete at the games. There was three qualification tournaments for countries to qualify their athletes. A nation may enter only three athletes per gender. If a nation does qualify the maximum number of athletes, it will also qualify for the team event in the respective gender.

See also
Archery at the 2016 Summer Olympics

References

 
International archery competitions hosted by Canada